"Find Me" is a song by British electronic music duo Sigma. It features vocals from English singer Birdy. It was released on 4 November 2016, through 3 Beat Records as the lead single from the duo's second studio album, Hope. The song peaked at number 36 on the UK Singles Chart and number one on the Billboard Dance Club Songs chart in its 20 May 2017 issue.

Music video
The official music video, directed by Christopher Sims, was uploaded to YouTube on 3 November 2016. The video features British actress Millie Bobby Brown as a young woman on an emotional journey through Los Angeles late at night.

Track listing

Chart performance

Weekly charts

Year-end charts

Certifications

See also
List of number-one dance singles of 2017 (U.S.)

References

2016 singles
2016 songs
Sigma songs
Pop ballads
3 Beat Records singles